Schefflera pueckleri, the  mallet flower, is a species of plant in the family Araliaceae. It is endemic to Peninsular Malaysia, in Southeast Asia.

Description
Schefflera pueckleri in small tree growing 15-20' tall. It has palmate leaves with 7-12 leaflets growing in a whorled fashion. It produces distinct green mallet shape flower buds.

Conservation
The plant is an IUCN Conservation-dependent species, that is endangered by habitat loss.

References

pueckleri
Endemic flora of Peninsular Malaysia
Conservation dependent plants
Taxonomy articles created by Polbot